The Lake Shore Limited is an overnight Amtrak intercity passenger train that runs between Chicago and either New York City or Boston via two sections east of Albany. The train began service in 1975; its predecessor was Amtrak's Chicago–New York Lake Shore, which operated during 1971–72. It is named for the New York Central (NYC) Lake Shore Limited, which was discontinued in 1956, and uses the NYC's former main line, part of which is now the Empire Corridor.

During fiscal year 2019, the Lake Shore Limited carried 357,682 passengers, an increase of 5.9% from FY2018. In FY2016, the train had a total revenue of $28,563,624, an increase of 0.2% over FY2015.

History 

The Lake Shore Limited is named after one of its predecessors that ran on the famed Water Level Route of the NYC. Like the present day Lake Shore Limited, the NYC edition offered service between New York and Boston and Chicago, although the New York Central used LaSalle Street Station. The New York Central annulled the Lake Shore Limited in 1956 as part of a system-wide reorganization. Service over the Water Level Route continued until the formation of Amtrak, with the last route being the New England States and an unnamed Penn Central successor.

Amtrak did not include service west of Buffalo over the New York Central's Water Level Route in its original route plan; Chicago–New York traffic was handled by the Broadway Limited using the Pennsylvania Railroad's main line via Pittsburgh, while Albany–Boston did not have any train service. Between May 1971 and January 1972, Amtrak operated the Chicago–New York Lake Shore with support from the state of Ohio. The present-day Lake Shore Limited began running October 31, 1975, with both New York and Boston sections.

The Lake Shore Limited was the last train to use the decaying Buffalo Central Terminal, departing on October 28, 1979. Since then it has used . Its New York terminus changed from Grand Central Terminal to Pennsylvania Station in 1991 following the opening of the Empire Connection.

On the night of August 3, 1994, around 3:45 am, the westbound Lake Shore Limited, with two locomotives and fifteen cars, and carrying roughly 320 passengers, and nineteen crew members, derailed on Conrail-owned tracks (now owned by CSX) near Batavia, New York. The initial derailment of the wheels of the third car on the train, occurred at milepost 403.7, and the train traveled for another three miles, until the general derailment of the train, at milepost 406.7. In all, fourteen cars derailed, with some sliding down an embankment, and 118 passengers and crew members were injured. However, there were no fatalities. The National Transportation Safety Board determined that the probable cause were the wheels coming off a section of flattened rail.

Service to Poughkeepsie began on November 8, 2010. In 2010–11, Amtrak studied restoring the Hammond–Whiting station stop just east of the Illinois-Indiana border (which had been dropped in 2003), but ultimately did not restore it due to the difficulty of routing trains to the station's single platform.

Due to planned repair work on the Freedom Tunnel, Spuyten Duyvil Bridge, and Track 19 in New York's Penn Station, the New York section was discontinued from May 26 to September 3, 2018. Passengers traveling to New York City could transfer at Albany–Rensselaer to Empire Service trains, which operated into Grand Central Terminal during the outage.

From October 1, 2020, to May 31, 2021, daily service was reduced to three trains per week due to the COVID-19 pandemic.

Possible future 
In the January 2011 issue of Trains Magazine, the Lake Shore Limited was listed as one of five routes to undergo improvement evaluation by Amtrak in FY 2011, just as the previous five routes (the Sunset Limited, Texas Eagle, California Zephyr, Capitol Limited, and Cardinal) had been examined in FY 2010.

Amtrak published its Performance Improvement Plan (PIP) for the Lake Shore Limited in September 2011. One idea was to change the train's eastbound departure time from Chicago to be earlier. It currently departs at 9:30 PM, to facilitate connections from often-late West Coast trains. The improved departure time would add $2 million in yearly revenue.

Amtrak considered more radical changes to the operations of the Lake Shore Limited, including a re-route over the Chicago–Detroit Line, but rejected them. This would be the first full New York City to Chicago train via southwestern Ontario and Detroit since the New York Central's Wolverine.

In 2021, Amtrak proposed adding an infill station between Erie and Buffalo in Chautauqua County, New York, in either Westfield or Dunkirk. Plans moved forward in 2022 to study the exact placement of the stop.

Operations

Consist 
The Lake Shore Limited consists of a New York section (train number 48 eastbound, 49 westbound) and a Boston section (448 eastbound, 449 westbound), which run combined between Chicago and Albany. As of February 2019, the train typically has two P42DC locomotives (or one P32AC-DM locomotive between New York and Albany), one Viewliner baggage car, three Amfleet II coaches, one Amfleet I split Business/Cafe car, one Viewliner II diner (exclusively accessible to sleeper passengers), and three Viewliner Sleepers.

In normal service, at Albany, the train splits into its Boston and New York sections. Low demand and cost-cutting led Amtrak to drop through service to Boston between 2003 and 2008; passengers made a cross-platform transfer to a shuttle train. The New York section uses a single dual-mode P32AC-DM for third-rail power in Pennsylvania Station. West of Albany, power is provided by two or three GE Genesis P42DC or P40DC diesel locomotives, which continue on to Boston.

In the late 1990s Amtrak considered adding Dunkirk, New York, as a stop between Buffalo and Erie. Dunkirk was listed as a stop with service "to commence on a date to be announced" on several timetables, but the stop was never added.

During the 2000s and 2010s the Lake Shore Limited carried either a Horizon Fleet or Amfleet lounge car. Between November 2007 and December 2009, maintenance problems led Amtrak to withdraw the Heritage diners and substitute Amfleet Cafe-based diner-lites, a move that became a source of passenger displeasure and a liability for the route, as the Heritage cars could prepare fresh food on board. In July 2016, Amtrak once again replaced the Lake Shore's full-service dining car with an Amfleet II diner-lite. This was due to Heritage shortages, as well as a multi-year delay in delivery of the new CAF Viewliner II cars, including 25 diners.

Service to Poughkeepsie began on November 8, 2010.

In FY 2010, only fifteen percent of passengers traveled between endpoints (Chicago and Boston or New York), although those travelers contributed 27 percent of ticket revenue. The remainder traveled to and from intermediate stations. According to Amtrak, passengers making connections in Chicago accounted for "a significant portion" of the Lake Shore Limited’s ridership and revenues.

In June 2018, Amtrak replaced the Amfleet II diner-lites with Viewliner II diners and adjusted the on board service by serving a selection of primarily-cold, exclusively pre-packaged boxed meals. The dining car is also now available as lounge space for sleeping car passengers even outside of meal times, but is closed to coach passengers. In January 2019, Amtrak significantly updated the boxed meal service to offer a full continental buffet at breakfast, and multiple hot entrées for lunch and dinner. Also in January 2019, Amtrak removed the baggage car from the Boston section of the train, thereby eliminating all checked baggage and bike service between Boston and Albany. The New York section retains its baggage car. In October 2019, Amtrak again modified the on board dining service for sleeping car passengers by serving the pre-prepared meals on new reusable trays instead of in single use boxes to improve the meal presentation along with a refresh of the entree choices.

, Viewliner II sleepers were expected to be added to the Lake Shore Limited that September.

Route details

The Lake Shore Limited between Chicago and New York City operates over the trackage of five railroad companies. From Chicago to Cleveland, the train rides the Chicago Line, which belongs to Norfolk Southern Railway, and is also used by Amtrak's Chicago-Washington, DC, train, the Capitol Limited. From Cleveland to Hoffmans, the Lake Shore rides on trackage belonging to the following CSX Transportation subdivisions: Cleveland Terminal, Erie West, Buffalo Terminal, Rochester, Syracuse Terminal, Mohawk, Selkirk, and Hudson.

Amtrak tracks are used twice: between Hoffmans and Poughkeepsie; and from the Bronx to Penn Station. The New York section only stops to discharge passengers southbound. Northbound trains only stop at Croton-Harmon and Poughkeepsie to receive passengers.

The Boston section runs on the trackage of several companies as well. The train travels on Amtrak's Post Road Branch from Rensselaer to nearby Schodack, from Schodack to Worcester on CSX's Berkshire and Boston subdivisions, and from Worcester to South Station on the Framingham/Worcester Line track owned and operated by the Massachusetts Bay Transportation Authority (MBTA). This section only stops eastbound to discharge passengers from Worcester eastward, while westbound trains only stop to receive passengers at Back Bay and Framingham.

There is a short distance of trackage between Hudson and Schenectady that allows for  operations. Delays to trains 448 and 449 have been common due to the high amount of freight traffic on the single-track railroad between Albany and Worcester.

References

Notes

External links 

 

Amtrak routes
Passenger rail transportation in Illinois
Passenger rail transportation in Indiana
Passenger rail transportation in Ohio
Passenger rail transportation in Pennsylvania
Passenger rail transportation in New York (state)
Passenger rail transportation in Massachusetts
Night trains of the United States
Long distance Amtrak routes